Drypta dentata is a species of ground beetle in the genus Drypta.

References

Beetles described in 1790
Dryptinae